Riverside High School is a secondary school for grades 7 through 12 in Lake City, Arkansas, United States. It is the sole high school serving the Riverside School District.

Campus
Riverside High School is located in Lake City, alongside the Riverside West Elementary. The building was constructed in 2011 and houses grades 7–12. In 2020 an indoor baseball/softball complex was constructed on campus in-between the softball and baseball fields.

Academics 
The assumed course of study for students follows the Smart Core curriculum developed by the Arkansas Department of Education (ADE). Students complete regular (core and career focus) courses and exams and may select Advanced Placement (AP) coursework and exams that provide an opportunity for college credit before graduation.

Riverside's READ program allows students to obtain an associate degree through Arkansas State University Newport simultaneously with their high school diploma, free of charge.

Student body 
The Riverside High School Student Council is made up of three representatives from each grade (7-12), and 1 President. The Seat of the Vice President was amended in the constitution years ago when the Student Council stated that "All members are leaders", therefore only a President is elected. Each member is chosen through popular vote.

Extracurricular activities
The school's teams, known as the Riverside Rebels, with maroon and gray serving as the school colors. For 2012–14, the Rebels compete in 2A Classification from the 2A Region 3 Conference as administered by the Arkansas Activities Association. Teams are fielded in golf (boys/girls), bowling (boys/girls), basketball (boys/girls), baseball, softball, tennis (boys/girls) and track and field (boys/girls).

 Tennis: The girls tennis team has won four state championships (2008, 2010, 2011, 2012).

References

External links

Schools in Craighead County, Arkansas
Public high schools in Arkansas